Glossodoris kophos is a species of sea slug, a dorid nudibranch, a shell-less marine gastropod mollusk in the family Chromodorididae.

Distribution 
The type locality for this species is Laha, Ambon Island, Indonesia, .

References

Chromodorididae
Gastropods described in 2001